Egerton MS 88 is a late sixteenth-century Irish manuscript, now housed in the British Library Egerton Collection, London. It is the work of members of the O'Davorens (Irish: Ó Duibhdábhoireann), a distinguished family of lawyers in Corcomroe, Co. Clare, and was compiled between 1564 and 1569 under the supervision of Domhnall Ó Duibhdábhoireann.

The document is an important collection of medieval Irish legal texts, literature, grammatical works and legal glossaries.

References
Welch, Robert. Oxford  Companion to Irish Literature. Oxford, 1996. 420.

External links
Contents of Egerton 88, Clare Library.

Irish manuscripts
16th-century manuscripts
Irish texts
Early Irish literature
Irish law
Egerton collection
1560s works
1560s in Ireland